Gavareshkan (also Romanized as Gavāreshkan and Gavāreshgan) is a village in Radkan Rural District, in the Central District of Chenaran County, Razavi Khorasan Province, Iran. At the 2006 census, its population was 138, in 37 families.

References 

Populated places in Chenaran County